Ahmadabad in Qazvin Province may refer to:
 Ahmadabad, Abgarm
 Ahmadabad, Dashtabi
 Ahmadabad, Takestan